Maziya Priyala Preet Kalena (IAST:Mājhiyā Priyālā Prīta Kaḷēnā) is a Marathi Indian soap opera created and produced by Ekta Kapoor under her banner Balaji Telefilms. The series premiered on 8 June 2010 and ended on 30 July 2011 which was aired on Zee Marathi. The series premiered from Monday to Saturday at 8 pm by replacing Kulvadhu.

Summary 
The series revolves around an innocent girl Shamika (Mrunal Dusanis) who is NRI and a middle class boy Abhijeet Pendse (Abhijeet Khandkekar) who falls in love with her. The series explores their lives and the hardships faced but solved with their unconditional love for each other and the emotional journey they undergo.

Plot 
Shamika Raje, a beautiful NRI comes to India with her loving step-mother Sandhya and step-sister Riya to seek her partner. Sandhya arranges Shamika's alliance with Jay Prabhu, son of Leena Prabhu, Sandhya's friend. Jay is a playboy hence asks his cousin brother Abhijeet Pendse to receive them. Abhi falls for Shamika but is unaware about his feelings. Abhi tries to establish a relationship between Shamika and Jay. During this Jay unwilling misframes Abhi for his mistakes. Jay's friend Rahul tries to misbehave with Riya and Abhi opposes him. Rahul tries to torture Riya and Shamika but ends up shooting Abhi. Abhi during this reveals his love for Shamika to her. He is saved and  Abhi and Shamika clear all the misunderstandings and learn the true colors of Jay. Shamika accepts Abhi's love and they start a relationship.

Elsewhere it is revealed that Sandhya is blackmailing Jay and Leena to get him married to Shamika to transfer all the property to her and Riya. Since Jay was responsible for Ashwini, Shamika's elder sister death, Sandhya blackmails Jay and Leena. It is revealed that Ashwini was actually saved by Abhi and his friends and she was into coma. Riya also meanwhile falls for Abhi. She attempts suicide but is saved by Abhi who learns her feelings and Shamika. Jay is enraged by Abhi's life and Shamika's declining proposal frames Abhi for a fraud with his ex-girlfriend Soniya. Shamika but successfully saves Abhi from this issue. During this, Riya learns that all the assets and property belong to Shamika alone. To avenge this, she joins hands with Jay to separate Abhi and Shamika. Shamika passes all the tests by Abhi's family and gets accepted by them. 

During Abhi and Shamika's engagement, Jay reveals that he falsely married Shamika and is the owner of her property. Leena gets disgusted by all this planning and plotting and tries to save Ashu who was kidnapped and kept hidden by Sandhya. Leena learns all the truth and blackmails Sandhya to mend ways for good. But Sandhya kills her by poisoning her.

Cast 
 Mrunal Dusanis as Shamika Raje - Pendse, Sandhya's step- daughter, Ashwini 's younger sister, Rita's step-sister
 Abhijeet Khandkekar as Abhijeet Pendse, Vibhavari and Subhash's son, Madhuri and Meghana's brother, Shamika's husband.
 Sneha Kulkarni as Riya, Chandu's wife, Abhi's ex-lover, Sandhya's daughter, Ashu and Shamika's step-sister.
 Prasad Jawade as Jay Prabhu, Leena's son, Abhi, Meghana and Madhuri's cousin.
 Harshada Khanvilkar as Sandhya Raje, Riya's mother, Shamika and Ashwini's step-mother.
 Sanjay Mone as Subhash Pendse, Abhi, Meghana, Madhuri's father, Leena's brother.
 Suhita Thatte as Vibhavari Pendse, Abhi, Meghana, Madhuri's mother.
 Sumukhi Pendse as Leena Pendse - Prabhu, Jay's mother, Subhash's sister, Abhijeet's aunt, Sandhya's best friend.
 Dhanashri Kadgaonkar as Meghana Pendse, Abhi and Madhuri's younger sister, Subhash and Vibhavari youngest daughter.
 Sankarshan Karhade as Chandu, Abhi's friend, Riya's husband.
 Amita Khopkar as Maai, Raje's Caretaker.
 Jui Gadkari as Soniya, Jai's ex-girlfriend.
 Tanvi Kishore as Namrata

Awards

References

External links 
 
 

Balaji Telefilms television series
2010 Indian television series debuts
2011 Indian television series endings
Marathi-language television shows
Zee Marathi original programming